State Farm Arena (formerly Philips Arena) is a multi-purpose arena located in Atlanta, Georgia. The arena serves as the home venue for the National Basketball Association (NBA)'s Atlanta Hawks. It also served as home to the National Hockey League's Atlanta Thrashers from 1999 to 2011, before the team moved to Winnipeg, as well as the Women's National Basketball Association (WNBA)'s Atlanta Dream from 2008 to 2016 and 2019, and the temporary Home of the Georgia Tech Basketball in 2011. It opened in 1999 at a cost of $213.5 million, replacing the Omni Coliseum. It is owned by the Atlanta Fulton County Recreation Authority and operated by the Hawks, owned by Tony Ressler along with a group of investors including Grant Hill.

Layout

The arena seats 19,050 for basketball and 17,624 for ice hockey. The largest crowd ever for an Atlanta Hawks basketball game at the arena was Game 6 of the 2008 Eastern Conference First Round on May 2, 2008 (against the Boston Celtics), where there was an announced attendance of 20,425. The arena includes 92 luxury suites, 9 party suites, and 1,866 club seats. For concerts and other entertainment events, the arena can seat 21,000.

The arena was originally laid out in a rather unusual manner, with the club seats and luxury boxes aligned solely along one side of the playing surface, and the general admission seating along the other three sides (the arrangement was later emulated in Ford Field, Addition Financial Arena, Soldier Field, Levi's Stadium, and other venues). This layout was a vast contrast to many of its contemporaries, which have their revenue-generating luxury boxes and club seats located in the 'belly' of the arena, thus causing the upper deck to be 2–4 stories higher. The layout at Philips was done so as to be able to bring the bulk of the seats closer to the playing surface while still making available a sufficient number of revenue-raising club seats and loges. Renovations in 2017–18 removed the upper levels of the suite wall in favor of premium seating spread throughout the arena, turning those upper areas to standard seating.

On the exterior, angled steel columns supporting the roof facing downtown spell out "ATLANTA." The side facing the Georgia World Congress Center originally spelled out "CNN" (whose headquarters adjoins the arena), but that section has since been altered to accommodate a Taco Mac restaurant. The GWCC/CNN Center rail station below the arena provides access to MARTA public transportation.

Amsterdam-based technology company Philips purchased the initial naming rights to the arena in February 1999 for $185 million over 20 years. In February 2018, it was reported that Philips would not renew its naming rights agreement for the arena when it expired in June 2019, primarily due to Philips' withdrawal from the consumer electronics market in 2013. On August 29, 2018, State Farm purchased the naming rights to the arena, in a 20-year deal that cost $175 million.

For the 2007–2008 season, State Farm Arena utilized the new "see-through" shot clock units which allow spectators seated behind the basket to see the action without having the clocks interfere with their view, joining FedExForum, Wells Fargo Center, TD Garden, United Center, Footprint Center and the Spectrum Center. Video advertising panels replaced the traditional scrolling panels.

Banners

Atlanta Hawks
Title banners
1958 NBA championship
1970 Western Division Champions
1980, 1987, 1994 Central Division Champions
2015 Southeast Division Champions

Atlanta Dream
2010, 2011, 2013 Eastern Conference Champions

Atlanta Thrashers (1999–2011)
 2006–07 Southeast Division Champions

Widespread Panic
20 Sold Out Shows; 1999–2013
Started 1999
Ended 2013

History

During the late 1980s and early 1990s, many cities started building new state-of-the-art sporting venues for their NBA and/or NHL franchises, or in hopes of attaining one. Many of these arenas had modern amenities for their high-end customers, such as luxury boxes, club seats, and large, posh club-level concourses; some even had practice facilities on-site. These attractions were rarely found in arenas constructed in the early 1970s, when the Omni Coliseum was built.  However, it was likely that the Omni would have had to be replaced in any event.  It had been built using Cor-Ten weathering steel that was intended to seal itself, ensuring it would last for decades.  However, the Omni's designers didn't account for Atlanta's humid climate.  The Cor-Ten steel never stopped rusting, causing the arena to deteriorate faster than anticipated.

Ted Turner, owner of the Hawks at the time, wanted to bring the NHL back to Atlanta; the city's first NHL team, the Atlanta Flames, had moved to Calgary in 1980. However, the NHL determined that the Omni was not suitable even as a temporary facility due to its structural problems and lack of amenities. The league told Turner that it would only grant an expansion team on condition that a new arena be in place for the prospective team's inaugural season. After much consideration of possible other sites both in Downtown Atlanta and in the suburbs, it was decided that the Omni would be demolished in 1997, and a new arena would be built in the same location; the Omni was demolished on July 26, 1997. The Hawks split their games between the Georgia Dome and Alexander Memorial Coliseum for the next two seasons while Philips Arena was under construction.

Philips Arena held its first event with a September 1999 concert by the musician Sir Elton John. The Omni's "center-hung scoreboard" now hangs in the lobby of Philips Arena, where it still displays the Omni's logo along with those of Philips Arena, the Hawks, and the Thrashers (who never played in The Omni). The scoreboard still functions and displays information relevant to the game taking place in the arena.  On April 2, 2009, Philips Arena achieved LEED for Existing Building: Operations and Maintenance certification as specified by the United States Green Building Council (USGBC). It was the world's first LEED certified NBA/NHL arena. It has been nicknamed the "Highlight Factory", due to the number of exciting plays, or highlights, that occur and Philips' history with lights and electronics.

On March 14, 2008, an EF2 Tornado struck near the Arena as part of a tornado outbreak that hit the city. The arena only received minor exterior damage.

Events

The arena hosted the NBA All-Star Game in 2003 and the Atlantic Coast Conference men's basketball tournament in 2012.

The first playoff game in any professional league played in Philips Arena was in 2005, when the Georgia Force of the Arena Football League hosted, and won, its first home playoff game. The first NHL playoff game in Philips Arena was in 2007, the Thrashers' only appearance in the Stanley Cup Playoffs. The first NBA playoff game in Philips Arena was in 2008, when the Hawks made the 2008 NBA Playoffs after an eight-season drought of missing the playoffs. On April 10, 2011, the Thrashers lost to the Pittsburgh Penguins, 5–2, in their final game. Tim Stapleton scored the final goal for the Thrashers in team history.

The venue had been named the site of the 2005 Southeastern Conference Women's Basketball Tournament; however, when the NHL announced in early 2004 that the 55th NHL All-Star Game, scheduled for February 2005 would be held in Atlanta, arena officials withdrew the Southeastern Conference women's basketball tournament – which was then moved 140 miles to the northeast along Interstate 85 to the BI-LO Center in Greenville, South Carolina. Oddly, the arena would not even be the host of that planned All-Star Game due to the 2004–05 NHL lockout. As a result, Atlanta became the second (San Jose being the first) city to lose a planned All-Star Game because of a labor dispute. Philips Arena would later be announced as home to the 56th NHL All-Star Game in 2008. Also, Philips Arena hosted game three of the 2010 WNBA Finals, where the Seattle Storm defeated the Atlanta Dream.

In 2013, Philips Arena hosted the finals of the men's NCAA Division II and Division III college basketball championships. The events were held as an undercard to the 2013 NCAA Final Four held at the Georgia Dome, in celebration of the 75th edition of the NCAA Men's Division I Basketball Championship.

MMA & Wrestling
The arena hosted UFC 88, UFC 145, UFC 201, and UFC 236 in 2008, 2012, 2016 and 2019 respectively. Philips Arena also hosted the 2011 WWE Hall of Fame induction ceremony, the night before WrestleMania XXVII which was held at the Georgia Dome. Philips Arena also hosted the Royal Rumble in 2002 and 2010, Backlash in 2007, Hell in a Cell in 2012, Survivor Series in 2015, and Day 1 in 2022. An edition of WCW Monday Nitro was also held when the arena was known as Philips Arena on June 5, 2000. The arena hosted the February 19, 2020 episode of AEW Dynamite featuring All Elite Wrestling's first-ever Steel cage match.

Concerts
State Farm Arena is among the busiest arenas for concerts in the world, having sold well over 550,000 concert tickets in 2007 and ranked as the third-busiest arena in the U.S. in 2011. State Farm has hosted such concerts as Elton John, The Who, and The Weeknd.

Other events
The arena hosted the 2004 US Figure Skating Championships.

Every year in January, the State Farm Arena hosts one of the largest Christian college aged conferences: Passion Conference. The conference typically takes place over the first weekend in the new year and features big names in the Christian world such as Louie Gigilio, Chris Tomlin, Matt Redman, Kristian Stanfill, John Piper, rap artist Lecrae and many more. The conference is typically sold out.

Renovations

Shortly after acquiring the Hawks and the operating rights to Philips Arena on June 24, 2015, Tony Ressler announced his intentions of remodeling the arena to keep the Hawks in Downtown Atlanta at a cost between $150 million and $250 million. The proposed renovation would rebuild the entire seating bowl to optimize its sightlines for basketball and remove the wall of suites which dominate one side of the arena and replace them with a more traditional suite configuration. The Hawks are also in discussions with the city about building a mixed-use entertainment district similar to L.A. Live around Philips Arena, to better connect it to other nearby attractions such as Centennial Olympic Park and Mercedes-Benz Stadium. On November 1, 2016, the Hawks and the city of Atlanta reached a financing agreement on renovating Philips Arena, with the city contributing $142.5 million and the Hawks $50 million plus cost overruns to the project. With the renovation, the Hawks signed a lease extension lasting through June 30, 2046, with an early termination penalty of $200 million plus the remaining balance of the arena's bonds.

The first phase of renovations, completed during the Hawks' 2017 off-season, removed the upper levels of the suite wall, reducing the total number of suites from 90 to 40, and added the Courtside Club behind one of the baskets. Renovations for 2018 were described by Hawks chief operating officer Thad Sheely as a "gut rehab". The arena renovations brought new premium seating areas, connected 360-degree concourses, a new center-hung videoboard three times larger than its predecessor as well as additional videoboards in the corners of the upper decks, new dining options including a bar and grill operated by country group Zac Brown Band and other unique features including an in-arena barber shop operated by Atlanta rapper Killer Mike and Topgolf suites. Over  of former office and storage space within the arena was repurposed as "fan space". The first ticketed event at the renovated State Farm Arena was So So Def's 25th anniversary concert on October 21, 2018, while the Hawks' first regular season home game took place on October 24 against the Dallas Mavericks.

Due to the renovations conflicting with the WNBA schedule, the Dream announced that they would move their 2017 and 2018 home schedules to McCamish Pavilion on the campus of Georgia Tech, mirroring the Hawks' move to the same venue (then known as Alexander Memorial Coliseum) between the time the Omni was razed and State Farm Arena was built. With the release of the 2019 WNBA schedule on December 18, 2018, the Dream confirmed that they would be returning to State Farm Arena. However, following the conclusion of the 2019 WNBA regular season, team officials indicated that the Dream would not be returning to State Farm Arena for the next season (which would be in 2021 due to the 2020 WNBA season being played in a COVID-19 bubble), citing disagreements with the Hawks' management. On October 18, 2019, the Dream announced that they would move to the Gateway Center Arena in suburban College Park, sharing the venue with the Hawks' NBA G League affiliate, the College Park Skyhawks.

References

External links

 

1999 establishments in Georgia (U.S. state)
Atlanta Dream venues
Atlanta Hawks venues
Atlanta Thrashers
Basketball venues in Georgia (U.S. state)
College basketball venues in the United States
Defunct National Hockey League venues
Georgia Tech Yellow Jackets basketball venues
Indoor arenas in Georgia (U.S. state)
Indoor ice hockey venues in the United States
Leadership in Energy and Environmental Design certified buildings
Music venues completed in 1999
Music venues in Georgia (U.S. state)
National Basketball Association venues
State Farm
Sports venues completed in 1999
Sports venues in Atlanta
Arquitectonica buildings